Jean-François de la Cour de Balleroy  was a French Navy officer. He notably served during the War of American Independence.

Biography 
Balleroy was born to a family from Normandie.

Balleroy joined the Navy as a Garde-Marine in 1742. He served on Content. He rose to Lieutenant in 1756.

In 1767, Balleroy captained the 24-gun fluyt Bricole, sailing between Brest and Rochefort. In 1768, he was at Almería.

and to Captain in 1772.

In 1775, Balleroy captained the 32-gun frigate Aigrette for missions in the Mediterranean.

In 1779, he was given command of Éveillé, part of the squadron under Orvilliers. He captained the 64-gun Indien at the Battle of Martinique on 17 April 1780, as well as in the actions of 15 May and 19 May 1780. 

After the Battle of the Saintes, Balleroy was one of the members of the inquiry into the conduct of the French captains during the battle.

At the French Revolution, Balleroy was serving in Brest, from where he fled France to become an émigré.

Sources and references 
 Notes

Citations

References
 
 

External links
 
 

French Navy officers
French military personnel of the American Revolutionary War